Vishwaroopam is a 1980 Indian Tamil-language film directed by A. C. Tirulokchandar for Krishna's Padmalaya Pictures. The film stars Sivaji Ganesan, Sridevi and Sujatha. It is a remake of the 1976 Hindi film Adalat. The film was released on 6 November 1980.

Plot 
Sathyamoorthy is an innocent and honest hardworking villager. He helps Ashok, Rajan and their friend in a time of trouble, who offer him a lot of money in return. He insults them saying he did his duty and money isn't everything. However, fate plays a cruel turn making him desperate for money to treat his wife. He runs to them and they turn him into a criminal, much like them. He gains experience quickly, and soon usurps their dominance. His wife and son, Raja, however are unaware of his activities.

Cast 
Sivaji Ganesan as Sathyamoorthy and Raja
Sujatha as Savithri
Sridevi as Geetha
Major Sundarrajan as Rajan
V. S. Raghavan
R. S. Manohar as Ashok
S. V. Ramadas
Thengai Srinivasan
Manorama

Soundtrack 
The soundtrack was composed by M. S. Viswanathan.

Release and reception 
Vishwaroopam was released on 6 November 1980, Diwali day. Piousji of Sunday wrote, "Though Sivaji was rather impressive in the father's role he looked almost silly as the son." T. N. Krishnan, writing for Kalki, called the film a Vishwaroopam (great form) with regards to cast performances.

References

External links 

 

1980 films
1980s Tamil-language films
Films directed by A. C. Tirulokchandar
Films scored by M. S. Viswanathan
Tamil remakes of Hindi films